Buttar Kalan is a village of Gurdaspur district in Punjab, India  Kalan is Persian language word which means Big. It is located in the Qadian sub-tehsil of the district.

Culture 
Punjabi is the primary language of the village, predominated by the Jatt people of Buttar clan.

See also 
Buttar, the Jatt clan
Buttar Kalan, Moga
Buttar Sarinh
Aasa Buttar

References 

Villages in Gurdaspur district